The Lola T60 was an open-wheel formula race car, designed, developed, and built by British manufacturer Lola Cars, for Formula Two racing, in 1965.

References

Formula Two cars
Open wheel racing cars
Lola racing cars